A. N. Yusuff (born 12 February 1926) was an Indian politician and leader of Communist Party of India. He represented Mannarkkad constituency in 5th KLA.

References

Communist Party of India politicians from Kerala
1926 births
Possibly living people
Kerala MLAs 1977–1979